Stanley Norwood Doust (29 March 1878 – 13 December 1961) was an Australian-born tennis player who captained his nation's Davis Cup team and was winner of the Mixed Doubles Trophy at Wimbledon.

Early years
Doust was born in Newtown, New South Wales, the only son of Isaac Doust, landowner and property developer, and his wife Lucy Ellen (née Dunlop). His elder sister was Edith Lucy Doust (1875–1947), who married Harry Wolstenholme and was an early female graduate at the University of Sydney and tennis player. Living in Marrickville and Wyroolah Dulwich Hill, Doust was educated at Newington College commencing in 1887 at the age of eight. On 18 August 1903, at the Presbyterian Church in Petersham, he married Dorothy Mary Storer.

Tennis career
Doust played in the Australian Open in 1907 and 1908. In 1909 he played Wimbledon in doubles with Harry Parker. In 1913 he was defeated at Wimbledon by Maurice Evans McLoughlin. in the same year he captained the Australian Davis Cup team that won against the United States team with McLoughlin in it. His last major title win was the 1926 British Covered Court Championships mixed championship where he played with Joan Ridley. In his obituary in The Times he is described as; "One of the last of the world's great 'dolly' servers and particularly nimble about the court, he was seen at his best in doubles matches ... he used a well-placed, low-bouncing service that forced his opponent to hit upwards while [he] moved in to volley."

A. Wallis Myers of The Daily Telegraph ranked Doust as world No. 8 in 1913.

Grand Slam finals

Doubles (1 runner-up)

World War I
Doust served as a lieutenant during World War I.

Journalist
For 31 years from 1920, Doust was the lawn tennis correspondent for the Daily Mail. He died in a London hospital aged 83.

References

External links
 
 
 

1878 births
1961 deaths
Australian male tennis players
People educated at Newington College
Tennis players from Sydney